Víctor Manuel Pasillas (born February 17, 1992) is an American professional boxer.

Amateur career
Pasillas has a phenomenal amateur record of 272 - 6. He has won 25 national amateur titles and holds notable wins over 2012 US olympians Jose Ramírez and Joseph Diaz.

Víctor featured in the boxing documentary Born and Bred.

Professional career
On November 12, 2011 Pasillas beat the veteran José García to win his professional debut. This bout was on the undercard of Manny Pacquiao vs. Juan Manuel Marquez III.

References

External links

American boxers of Mexican descent
Boxers from California
Featherweight boxers
1992 births
Living people
American male boxers
People from East Los Angeles, California